Chertkovo is a rural locality (a settlement) and the administrative center of Chertkovsky District in Rostov Oblast, Russia. Population: 

It is separated from the urban-type settlement of Milove in Milove Raion of Luhansk Oblast, Ukraine partially by the North Caucasus Railway. The railway together with surrounding infrastructure is located on the Russian side of the border. Both localities were served by Chertkovo railway station until the Russo-Ukrainian War. A bypass avoiding the border was completed between Zhuravka and Millerovo in 2017 after which traffic to Chertkovo ceased. The railway station was liquidated in 2019.

Climate

References

Rural localities in Rostov Oblast
Don Host Oblast